Pop Don't Stop (subtitled Greatest Hits) is a greatest hits collection by English singer Kim Wilde. The album was announced on 15 May 2021 and was released on 6 August 2021 as a 2-CD standard edition and a 5-CD + 2-DVD Collectors edition. The collection includes seven top 10 UK singles, the new single "Shine On" with Boy George, and a B-sides collection, including four songs making their debut on CD.

Critical reception

Ange Chan from We Are Cult called the set "a masterclass in commercially produced pop music". Retro Pop gave the album a perfect 5 out of 5 saying "Not only does Pop Don't Stop bring together all of Kim's releases - including global chart hits and limited releases – it also marks the first time several tracks have been issued on CD, making the set ideal for longtime fans and new listeners."

Track listing

Charts

In France the album peak at number 200 for one week.

Release history

References

2021 greatest hits albums
Kim Wilde compilation albums